Gordon Fraser (born 16 May 1973) is a Scottish entrepreneur, producer, actor, singer, writer, motivational speaker, and philanthropist. He divides his time between Los Angeles and London.

Early life
Gordon Fraser, who is of Scottish descent, was born in Ayr and raised in Glasgow. He attended The Glasgow Academy until the age of 17, then waited tables at Parklands Country Club and other restaurants and hotels in Glasgow. He initially did not have the financial resources to pursue training as an actor, so he turned to a career in sales.

Career
In 1995, Fraser joined the sales floor of British Telecom's first UK outbound Telesales Center, then moved to the customer service team. He worked in the London division for the Yellow Pages Sales Division before taking a sales position for the McAfee Anti-Virus Software Division. In 2002, Fraser left McAfee to pursue training as an actor at the London Academy of Music and Dramatic Art.

In 2008, Fraser returned to sales, joining the skin care and wellness brand Arbonne. He was the first man to rise to the level of Executive National Vice President in the company's 37-year history, in part because of his leadership in heading a network of Arbonne consultants and buyers in a global sales campaign. As part of his Network Marketing business, Fraser also became the face and spokesman for many of the products and he played a key role in reshaping the Arbonne brand to include men.

Starting in 2013, Fraser also expanded his speaking, writing, coaching, and consulting work, focusing on wellness, health, philanthropy, and entrepreneurship. His writings integrated mindfulness and purpose into his motivational and inspirational messages. Fraser also produced a number of creative projects, especially in the theatre and on screen, and developed a men's swimwear line called Bruno Lima.

Acting and producing
Fraser's first stage appearance was at age three at Ayr's Gaiety Theatre, when he appeared with the Scottish entertainer Glen Michael in his Cavalcade Show. He had regular appearances in Scottish professional and semi-professional theatre and TV and then auditioned for the London Academy of Music and Dramatic Art. He was accepted to LAMDA and graduated in 2003. His first professional role after graduating from LAMDA was to play the Master in Blanche MacIntyre's “The Master and Margarita” at London's Greenwich Theater. He also played the main character in the comedy Odor-Eater commercial that ran globally for two years.

Fraser regularly performed in theatre and television. He played the title role in The Nelson Musical (2005), a musical based on the life of Horatio Nelson. He played Nicolas in Richard Harris's tongue-in-cheek musical Celebrity Me, produced by Bill Kenwright, and as Lucius in Max Lewendel's International tour of Titus Andronicus. Fraser was cast as Daniel in Sky One's drama doc Coked Up Britain. Fraser was elected as Secretary and then Press Secretary of the British Actors Trade Union, Equity in 2005 for their Home Counties West Branch.

In 2006, Fraser originated the part of Tom and played opposite Anita Louise Coombe in Over the Threshold – a Musical Romp of Sexual Misdemeanours and Misunderstanding at the Gatehouse Theatre, Highgate. He played the role of the Sergeant in Irish playwright Kenneth Hickey's tragedy Song of the Shore directed by Emmy Award-winning director John Bruce at Windsor Arts Theatre.

His film work includes Blacking Iago on BBC America, This Year's Love directed by David Kane, Preaching to the Perverted directed by Stuart Urban, Red Light Runners directed by Graham Moore, and Gone directed Kevin Turrell.

In 2007, Fraser performed as Le Vicomte de Valmont in scenes from Les Liaisons Dangereuses, under the direction of Jennifer Gelfer and working alongside Carey Mulligan, at the Theatre Royal Haymarket. Fraser was also part of the LAMDA and the Royal Academy of Dramatic Art (RADA) alumni who inspired the Docu-Theatre production of A2K (Ali to Karim: A Tribute to the Ismaili Imams) which was commissioned by London's Ismaili Centre in celebration of the Aga Khan's 50th anniversary. In summer 2007, Fraser also collaborated with Gilbert Adair and New Gods & Heroes, Ltd for Gilbert's stage adaptation of Love and Death on Long Island based on a novella loosely based on Thomas Mann's Death in Venice, which also inspired the movie with Sir John Hurt & Jason Priestly. Fraser played the lead role of Ronnie Bostock. Fraser has also produced a number of projects for "New Gods & Heroes, Ltd", including both theater and online intellectual properties. In 2007, Fraser also worked at the invitation of director John Bruce in LoveBytes, for Sky One, a series of Shakespeare's Sonnets in contemporary settings with Kenneth Branagh, Zoe Wannamaker, Derek Jacobi & Tracy Childs.

In 2008, Fraser took a break from the acting world when he decided to build a Network Marketing business through Arbonne (see career section below). Fraser returned to the theatre and acting in 2014. He expanded his role to include producing as well as acting in productions across multiple formats. He collaborated with Bill Taub and the two created and co-produced "G-Spot", an online comedy series that debuted at the 2018 LA Webfest at Sony Pictures Entertainment Studies in Culver City, California on 27 April 2018. The story was loosely based on Fraser's experiences in Los Angeles and his befriending of psychic twins, Terry and Linda Jamison. G-Spot was nominated for Best Comedy Series, Best Actor, Best Original Music, and Best Sound Design.

Writing
As a creative writer and social commentator, Fraser has contributed to The Gay Times, Pride and Equality, Talk Business, S.C.L, Authority, and Surrey Life magazines. He has a blog on the internet We are the City magazine. He also contributed a chapter to The Four Year Career by Richard Brooke (London: Bliss Business, 2017).

Other publications that regularly feature his writings on lifestyle and business include Authoritymagazine, Business Digest magazine, Business Manchester, Insight magaziner, Career Gal, and Savoir Faire magazine.

UNILAD author Emma Rosemurgey interviewed Gordon on the significance of David Bowie coming out in 1972 not only for the LGBTQ rights movement, but also popular music for the next two decades.

In 2021, Fraser joined Savoir Faire magazine as a staff columnist.

Philanthropy
Set up in 2012, the Gordon Fraser Scholarship at the London Academy of Music and Dramatic Art (LAMDA) provides vital support to students who would otherwise struggle to start or complete their training due to age or financial challenges. The scholarship was set up as a direct consequence of Fraser being unable to continue his own studies due to financial constraints. He also supports the Tyler Clementi Foundation (TCF), which is a charity guided by the life and story of Tyler Clementi, and promotes safe, inclusive and respectful social environments in homes, schools, campuses, churches and the digital world for vulnerable youth, LGBT youth and their allies.

Trivia
His nickname is "G". He is related to the owners of Daley's Department store (or Daley's), affectionately known as Harrods of the North (which once stood proudly in Sauchiehall Street) and to John Urie founder of City Bakeries and one time owner of Glasgow's Ca d’Oro Building. There is no connection to Sir Hugh Fraser founder of the British department stores House of Fraser or to the greetings card manufacturer of the same name.

References

External links
 
 Gordon Fraser on spotlight

Scottish male stage actors
Scottish male film actors
Scottish male television actors
21st-century Scottish male singers
Alumni of the London Academy of Music and Dramatic Art
1976 births
Living people